The University of Monterrey (acronym "UDEM") is a private Catholic-inspired secondary and higher education institution in the municipality of San Pedro Garza García, belonging to the Metropolitan Area of Monterrey, Nuevo León, Mexico. Founded in 1969, it is open to all creeds and conditions.

UDEM was founded by the Daughters of the Immaculate Mary of Guadalupe, the nuns of the Sacred Heart, the Marist Brothers and the La Salle Brothers, supported by an association of Catholic citizens. The idea originated from a recommendation given by the Second Vatican Council to use educational activities in favor of teaching the principles of the catholic doctrine.

The founding religious groups already had a deep history in Monterrey.  The Society of the Sacred Heart of Jesus had been working in Monterrey since 1908, and the Sisters of Immaculate Mary of Guadalupe founded Labastida University in 1951, and had been running Labastida College since 1919, an institution devoted to the education of girls and young ladies. On the other hand, the Marist Brothers had been working in Monterrey since 1905, and La Salle Brothers, who had left Mexico during the Revolution war, returned in 1942 to Monterrey to found the Instituto Regiomontano.

On July 8, 1969, the university was recognized as such by the state of Nuevo Leon and on September 8 of the same year, it began operating as an educational institution housed in 5 different facilities owned by the very same groups and associations that funded it, such as Labastida school.

Until one day a philanthropist named Roberto Garza Sada who studied at Massachusetts Institute of Technology searching to elevate education in Nuevo Leon Mexico started searching for some educators and at the same time for a piece of land bought the campus property and gave the money to start building this university on which later his daughter Margarita Garza Sada, looking to honor her father, and with Japanese Architect Tadao Ando, gave the money to build the Centro Roberto Garza Sada for Architecture and Design.

Currently, UDEM educates over 16 thousand students, including high school students, undergraduates and postgraduates. The school offers 4 high school modes, 46 majors, 13 bachelor's degrees and 37 medical specialties and doctorates.
UDEM offers a number of choices to study abroad; UDEM has established bilateral, reciprocal and unilateral agreements, as well as arrangements through academic exchange agencies.
In 2002, UDEM signed 26 new bilateral agreements with universities in the United States – such as the University of California – Berkeley and other universities in Spain, Italy, Belgium, England (such as University College, London), Germany and France (such as the Lycée Bossuet-Notre Dame, in Paris).

History

By 1972, UDEM had 22 majors and 3 baccalaureate degree programs.  That same year, 7 more academic divisions were created, amongst which were the Arts and Media Sciences, Education, Economics, Law, Mathematics, Health Studies and Social Studies. In 1979, a Mexican philanthropist named Roberto Garza Sada formed the Association for Educational Development, which sole purpose was to buy 35 acres of land in which they would build the actual campus for UDEM.

In 1982, activities in the Humberto Lobo UDEM high school begin and on August 21, 1998 the college community center is inaugurated in the presence of the then Mexican president Ernesto Zedillo. In January 2004, the Rector's building was constructed which houses dean's offices, the Center for Information and Student Attention (Centro de Información y Atención a Alumnos; CIAA), amongst other things. In July 2006, the new student dorms were inaugurated. In 2009, after 16 years of being the dean of UDEM, Francisco Ascúnaga Guerra resigned from his position and was succeeded Antonio Dieck Assad, who is the current dean. Currently, the building, named Centro Roberto Garza Sada in honor of the benefactor which bought the terrain where the school now stands, was designed by the famed Japanese architect Tadao Ando who originally called it "The Gate of Creation". The building's over 43 thousand ft² and was planned from its conception as a design, arts and architecture building. It will have several areas dedicated to these studies, as well as 22 laboratories and workshops to accommodate students expositions and art exhibits.

In 1982, the Vice-Rectory for Upper Middle Education was created and the activities of the Humberto Lobo High School began. On August 21, 1998, the building called the University Community Center (CCU) was inaugurated in a ceremony with the President Ernesto Zedillo. In January 2004 the Rectory building was inaugurated, where the offices of the Center for Information and Attention to Students (CIAA) are housed, as well as the continuing education rooms, among other things. In September 2005, laid the foundation stone for Residences on the adjacent 14-hectare site located to the west of the University. In July 2006, the complex called Residencias UDEM was inaugurated. In 2009, after 16 years as rector, on August 3, 2009, Dr. Francisco Azcúnaga Guerra presented his resignation, since then Dr. Antonio Dieck Assad has held the post of rector of the UDEM.

Seal
In 2014, UDEM evolved its graphic identity. In the highest point has the university name: "Universidad de Monterrey",  the circles contain the Latin phrase that currently serves as the University's motto. This phrase Homo Hominis In Ministerio Perficitur when translated means "Man is perfected in the service of man" and the mirrored laurels.

Campus
UDEM has only one university campus located in San Pedro Garza Garcia, Nuevo Leon, Mexico. But also has four preparatory locations (translated as units from the Spanish word for Unidades).  Said locations are San Pedro Campus(USP) located in the boundaries of the university campus, Valle Alto Campus (UVA) located in the Estanzuela, Monterrey, Nuevo Leon, Mexico, Fundadores Campus (UFU) located in Escobedo, Nuevo Leon, Mexico and the Obispado Campus (UNO) located in the Monterrey area. In addition classes of the  Nursing Degrees on Campus CHRISTUS Health Muguerza Conchita Hospital are offered.

Some of the businesses that have a presence on the main UDEM campus are:
 Bachiller, Bookstore and stationery
 Copimex of Monterrey, Copy and Print Center
 Exa Campus Store (Apple Inc. Authorized Campus Store) 
 Starbucks Coffee
 Subway (restaurant)
 Banorte
 Santander 
 7-eleven
Tim Horton's
Oxxo
Papa John's

Rector's Building and CIAA

In September 2001, after 10 years of planning, construction began on the rector's building, which is over 27,000 ft2. The building also houses the CIAA or Center for Information and Student Attention as translated to English. On 2003 it was inaugurated. Local Architect Bernardo Hinojosa oversaw the project.

The building also houses the vice-rectory for high school education, college education, development and administrative departments. A red and black sculpture called La Serpentina adorns the main plaza of the building, it was created by Fernando González Gortázar, an artist from Guadalajara. The red color symbolizes the warmth of human beings and as the flame within all of us to succeed.

CCU

Inaugurated in 1999 by former Mexican President Ernesto Zedillo, CCU stands for Centro de la Comunidad Universitaria and translates to College Community Center. The CCU is a recreational area for students which also houses the Culture department (in charge of all artistic events within the University or by the University's alumni), Pastoral Care department, the student council headquarters, a small chapel, the cafeteria, the music rooms, an auditorium, a common room and the film club.

The bell

When a student graduates, one of the most symbolic processes before fully graduating is to sound the bell. Its name is Vox Veritas which means "The Voice of Truth" and must be tolled three times total when a student has finished the requirements for his/her degree.

Library
In 1987, the library system of UDEM was consolidated and still operates today from the main/central library located at UDEM's campus and three other department libraries found in UDEM's preparatories. UDEM's library counts with up to 44 direct collective bargaining with local and national institutions, a total of 222,524 volumes of books, videos and E-book, a collection of 408,589 well known and globally recognized academic journals (in both press and on-line), a data base of 23,234 archived documents from institutions such as EBSCO, ProQuest, Wilson, Infolatina, Britannica, Ocenet, Gale and Routledge.

Among the library's most important collections, you can find:

Colección Xavier Moyssén about which deals with Mexican Art History and is restricted to authorized personnel.
INEGI's Library

Student dorms

In Mexico, it is uncommon for college students to leave their homes and start living by themselves. Fraternities and sororities are rarely heard of.  However, schools like UDEM receive a vast amount of foreign exchange students and, even when it is uncommon, people will eventually leave their homes and begin living independently.

For these reasons, UDEM started a student housing project called Residencias UDEM meaning UDEM Residence Halls. They were inaugurated in 2006 after 13 months of being planned and occupied over 14 acres within the grounds of the UDEM's campus. The project was overseen by authorities from Harvard university, Yale, Loyola and the University of the Americas (UDLA), as well as benefactors like Jane Wright from the Hanbury Evans Wright Vlattas firm. The dorms house up to 450 students.

Centro Roberto Garza Sada (CRGS) 
The Roberto Garza Sada Center (CRGS), named in honor of Don Roberto Garza Sada, was designed by Tadao Andō, one of the most recognized architects in the world and awarded the Pritzker Prize in 1995. The final investment of the work is around 45 million dollars, 21 being the main benefactor Doña Márgara Garza Sada de Fernández, daughter of Roberto Garza Sada.
CRGS The architectural work, baptized by its author as the "Gate of Creation", was officially inaugurated on April 29, 2013 in the presence of the Japanese architect, Doña Márgara Garza Sada de Fernández, the Governor in charge, Rodrigo Medina de la Cruz, the former municipal president of San Pedro Garza García, Mauricio Fernández Garza, among other business, political and academic personalities.

This building has 1,300 cubic meters of concrete and has 13,115.48 square meters of construction, distributed in spaces for design, research, teaching and exhibition, as well as 22 laboratories and workshops which design students can use. Currently, it has the LEED Certification in its “Silver” level, granted by the US Green Building Council (USGBC), with which it became the first work of Tadao Ando to receive a global sustainability certification.

ESTOA 
The building, inaugurated in May 2019 by the Mexican architect Tatiana Bilbao, is located to the west of the campus and has approximately 90 thousand square meters of construction, which accommodates student and coexistence areas and UDEM offices for customer service, in addition to Continuing Education rooms.

El Solar 

It covers the construction of a South Plaza, currently in use and a North Plaza or Cultural Plaza –on the western side of the project–, which together represent 7,900 m2 for the meeting and coexistence of the UDEM community, in addition to the area of the ravine - the east side.

High School UDEM 
Four different units situated in key locations across the city.

Valle Alto Unit

San Pedro Unit 

Launched in 1995 and located in the south of the university campus;  offers a program, called International bachelor's degree (BI), that combines science and humanities. The USP was placed, in the Enlace National Assessment, within the three percent of the best schools in Mexico in 2012, and share the facilities of the professional of the University of Monterrey.

Fundadores Unit 

Located on the limits of San Nicolás and Escobedo, it joined the UDEM family on August 6, 2007 with 62 first-time students.

Obispado Unit

Educational offering
UDEM offers to date:

Four high school programs 

 Bilingual Program - This program is given in Spanish and focuses on the knowledge and self-identity of the Mexican society. Students will learn to properly speak English as a second language and choose whether or not to study abroad in countries such as the United States, Canada or Europe. The program also features student trips to several Spanish speaking countries such as Argentina, Chile, Cuba, Spain, Panama and Peru.
 Bicultural Program - Designed for students who already are fluent in English, this program is given mostly in English and gives the option to choose between its modalities in English, German or French. Students also will learn about other cultures in favor of mutual respect and understanding. The featured exchange options are studying in Germany, Canada, USA, France, England and Switzerland.
 International Program - The international program, also known as the International Baccalaureate (IB), is perhaps the most recognized of all the others simply because it's actually an evaluated course by the International Baccalaureate Organization (IBO) which is headquartered in Geneva. The program features a multicultural edge and a highly demanding academic experience. Mixing science with human and social studies, IB works on developing intellectual skills on students, as well as communication skills, investigation methods, critical analysis and argumentative abilities that are reinforced with international experiences.
 General Program - This program is specifically targeted to obtain a certificate so students can continue their professional studies in one of 4 branches, at the same time their introduction into the business world is expedited. The 4 course branches are System Analysis, Accounting, Strategic Sales and Publicity Image.

Radio station UDEM 
On September 8, 1994, the first transmission of Radio UDEM, the 90.5 FM station with only 1000 watts of power, was conducted. However, in 2005, they increased capacity to 3,000 watts of power with which its usual programming stretched to year round transmissions.

All programming is designed and made by students of the second course of radio, who also participate in the entire process of issuance (planning, pre-production, operation, conduction and execution of programs).

From 2006, they began transmitting over the Internet.

 Centro de Medios (CEDEM)

The Center for Mass Media doubles as the classroom and practice center where students learn how to operate a radio broadcast, a live television broadcast and cinematography. Inaugurated in 1990, in counts with 5 video editing modules, personal HD cameras, wireless microphones, professional lighting, television format cameras with a prompter and a Television studio.

In addition, students have 870 options of exchange in 65 countries, of which 24% are with universities included among the top 500 in the world.

Trojans 
The Trojan is the school mascot and representative sports teams of UDEM. The name was chosen in 1981 and was, originally, just an American football team, which would win the championship in 1984 - 1985 from the National Educational Football Organization.

Today, the university has varsity teams in soccer, futsal, basketball, volleyball, track and field, swimming, Taekwondo, archery and tennis.

Leadership

CELES UDEM 
The Center for Student Leadership (CELES) has the mission to generate competence and leadership, rising the student's potential so they can transform society and transcend in it. CELES is dedicated to contribute to the formation of its students.

Student groups 
Fomenting student participation through student groups is one of CELES strategies to create high performance leaders in a civic-political environment. This groups live out a formative process that includes: a preparation course, political campaign, election making process, an oath and a year to perform their duties.

FEUDEM 
The biggest representative organism in the student body.

¡Lánzate! Center for Leadership and Challenge 

The center was built according to the standards of ACCT (Association for Challenge Course Technology), which regulates the quality in this type of structures and counts with qualified instructors. The design of the programs was made following the guidelines of the Association for Experiential Education (AEE).

Finally, the architectural design of the piece was in charge of Enrique Abaroa, as well as Challenge Towers, globally recognized for creating the "Discovery Course" which offers over 24 different challenges. Only four like this exist in the world, and this is the only in Mexico.

UDEM OpenCourseWare
In 2007, through the OpenCourseWare Consortium project, the University of Monterrey offers teachers and students anywhere around the world a collection of free access online courses with content of the graduate programs offered in the university. This way, UDEM hopes to contribute to the overall responsibility of educating and serving the community.

Community service

Altruistic Youths Thinking of Mexico 
JALPEM as it is commonly known is a student association.

Through more than 5 years, UDEM has accomplished an impact in several regions and in different aspects, such as getting medical, psychological and dental care to more than 3,200 people since its inauguration.

Medical Brigades 

UDEM's Medical Brigades is a high-performance group dedicated to the prevention of accidents and support to the community during events, such as practices and civil protection support, as well as helping the Red Cross

Phi Delta Epsilon: International Fraternity 
Phi Delta Epsilon is an international medical fraternity with the main goal of creating physicians with integrity and a life-time commitment to the principles of philanthropy, deity, and education, accomplishing this through companionship, service, assessment and ethical upbringing

UDEM is the only university in Mexico that has a chapter of this fraternity. (Epsilon Alpha Chapter)

Health and Development Center (Cesade) 

CESADE is made up of a team of multidisciplinary students borrowed from the Social Service fields, coordinated by professionals from distinct areas and UDEM's academics, which work together looking to establish and integral development in each and every single individual.

Early Education Self-Managed Centers (CAEI) 
Through this centers, UDEM has been able to provide an educational alternative to infants 3 to 4 years of age from impoverished zones for more than 15 years.

Summer camps 
For more than 20 years, UDEM has offered recreational and formative alternatives to more than 2 thousand children and mothers from impoverished zones. These courses, mostly offered in July, are organized and run in five locations by Social Service students.

Accreditation
The University of Monterrey has the following accreditations:

 SACS (Southern Association of Colleges and Schools)
 AACSB (Association to Advance Collegiate Schools of Business)
 AMBA (Association of MBAs)
 AMIESIC - Asociación Mexicana de Instituciones de Educación Superior de Inspiración Católica (Mexican Association of Higher Education Institutions with Catholic Inspiration)
 ASINEA - Asociación de Instituciones de Enseñanza de Arquitectura de la República Mexicana (Mexican Association of Architecture Teaching Institutions)
 AMFEM - Asociación Mexicana de Facultades y Escuelas de Medicina (Mexican Association of Medicine Schools)
 CACEI - Consejo de Acreditación de la Enseñanza de la Ingeniería (Engineering Teaching Accreditation Council)
 CONAC - Consejo de Acreditación de la Comunicación (Communication Accreditation Council)
 CNEIP - Consejo Nacional para la Enseñanza e Investigación en Psicología (National Council for Teaching and Research in Psychology)
 College Board
 FIMPES - Federación de Instituciones Mexicanas Particulares de Educación Superior (Federation of Mexican Private Higher Education Institutions)
 IBO - International High School Organization
 ISA - International Schools Association
 Puerto Rico Physician's Court
 ACCECISO - Asociación para la Acreditación y Certificación de Ciencias Sociales (Association for the Certification and Accreditation of Social Sciences)
 CACECA - Consejo de Acreditación en la Enseñanza de la Contaduría y Administración, A.C. (Accounting and Administration Teaching Accreditation Council)
 COMAEM - Consejo Mexicano para la Acreditación de la Educación Médica (Mexican Health Education Accreditation Council)
 CONAC - Consejo de Acreditación de la Comunicación (Communication Accreditation Council)
 CONACE - Consejo Nacional para la Acreditación de la Ciencia Económica (National Council for Accreditation of Economic Science)

References

External links

 

 
1969 establishments in Mexico
Educational institutions established in 1969
International Baccalaureate schools in Mexico
Universities and colleges accredited by the Southern Association of Colleges and Schools